Jackson River is a river located in Gulf County, Florida. It is a tributary of the Apalachicola River.

References

Rivers of Gulf County, Florida